Blanton Alspaugh (born 1959) is an American record producer, specialised in classical recordings. He has so far (the 64th Grammy Awards season) won 11 Grammy Awards.

Alspaugh earned a bachelor's of science degree in music education from Tennessee Technological University and a master's degree in orchestral conducting from Rice University. He has been a member of the Soundmirror classical music recording and production team since 1999.
 
He has worked with a variety of orchestras and musicians, including Detroit Symphony Orchestra, Los Angeles Opera Orchestra, the Harrington String Quartet, William Boggs, Stanislav Pronin and Emmanuel Feldman.
 
Alspaugh won his first Grammy in 2009 for Best Small Ensemble Performance for Spotless Rose: Hymns to the Virgin Mary.

References

1959 births
Living people
American record producers
Classical music producers
Grammy Award winners
Rice University alumni
Tennessee Technological University alumni